The 1st Libyan Division was an infantry division of the Royal Italian Army during World War II. It was commanded by general Luigi Sibille. The division took part in the Italian invasion of Egypt and was destroyed during the Battle of Sidi Barrani.

History 
The division's history begins with the Italian Libyan Colonial Division formed in the 1920s with local troops from Italian Libya. The division fought in the Second Italo-Abyssinian War.

On 1 March 1940 the 1st Libyan Division and 2nd Libyan Division were formed from existing units in Italian Libya. Both divisions consisted of Italian officers and local non-commissioned officers and troops. By the time Italy entered World War II the division had 7,224 troops and its commanding general was Luigi Sibille.

In September 1940 the 1st Libyan Division participated in the Italian invasion of Egypt. On 13 September the 1st Libyan Division and 1st Paratroopers Regiment "Fanti dell'Aria" attacked Sollum in British Egypt, which was defended by platoons of the Coldstream Guards. The British laid mines in the area and quickly withdrew to Marsa Matruh after suffering 50 casualties.

In December 1940 the 1st Libyan Division was deployed farthest of all Italian division into Egypt. Consequently its camp at Maktila was the first to be attacked during the British Operation Compass. On 10 December 1940, amid a howling sandstorm, the division offered stiff resistance, but by 11 December the division had disintegrated with heavy losses. The division was declared lost on 11 December 1940.

Organization 
 1st Libyan Division
 1st Libyan Infantry Grouping
 VIII Libyan Infantry Battalion "Bardia"
 IX Libyan Infantry Battalion "Agedabia"
 X Libyan Infantry Battalion "Nufilia"
 2nd Libyan Infantry Grouping
 XI Libyan Infantry Battalion "Derna"
 XII Libyan Infantry Battalion "Barce"
 XIII Libyan Infantry Battalion "Zezem"
 1st Libyan Artillery Grouping
 VI Libyan Artillery Group (77/28 field guns)
 VII Libyan Artillery Group (77/28 field guns)
 6th Libyan Anti-aircraft Battery (20/65 Mod. 35 anti-aircraft guns)
 7th Libyan Anti-aircraft Battery (20/65 Mod. 35 anti-aircraft guns)
 I Libyan Mixed Engineer Battalion
 1x Libyan engineer company
 1x Libyan telegraph and radio operators company
 1st Libyan Anti-tank Company (47/32 anti-tank guns)
 1st Libyan Transport Group
 1x Medical section
 1x Supply section
 26th Field Post Office

Commanding officers 
The division's commanding officers were:

 Generale di Brigata Luigi Sibille (1 March 1940 - 8 July 1940)
 Generale di Brigata Giovanni Cerio (9 July 1940) - 11 December 1940, POW)

See also 
 Italian Libyan Colonial Division
 2nd Libyan Division
 Maletti Group
 History of Libya as Italian Colony

References 

 

Infantry divisions of Italy in World War II
Libya in World War II
Italy–Libya relations
Military units and formations established in 1939
Military units and formations disestablished in 1940
Divisions of Italy of the Second Italo-Ethiopian War
1939 establishments in Italy